"Suga Suga" is a song by American rapper Baby Bash featuring Frankie J. The song was written by both singers and was released on July 21, 2003, as the second and final single from Baby Bash's third studio album, Tha Smokin' Nephew (2003). It is Baby Bash's highest-charting song on the US Billboard Hot 100, reaching number seven, and it appeared on several international rankings, including the New Zealand Singles Chart, where it peaked at number one. It has received sales certifications in Australia, Germany, New Zealand, and the United States.

"Suga Suga" was sampled in the Robin Schulz song "Sugar" in 2015.

Music video
The music video, filmed in New York City, shows Baby Bash and Frankie J in a car stuck in traffic, Frankie J turns on the video screen in Bash’s Escalade. A delivery woman in a low-cut shirt walks up, catching Bash and J's attention. She smiles at Bash and J as she walks by while the two sit on a porch with other men playing instruments. Bash and J watch the events in their car while jamming. Sitting on the porch, Bash and J throw peace signs to two other ladies who walk by. The neighbor girl upstairs throws down a flower to J, he smiles and throws a peace sign. A telephone repair woman dancing credited as the Call Girl catches the eye of Bash, and he dances with the Call Girl. A policewoman holding a stop sign, lets two women wearing low-cut school uniforms cross the road, all three then proceed to flirt with Bash and J. Bash pretends to paddle the policewoman with her stop sign. On Groovy Way, an ice cream woman dances with Bash. Bash walks the street dancing with other women and then dances with a female DJ. At a lounge, Bash, J, and other women dance. After watching the events in their car, it is shown Bash and J are escorting three women, who are in the back seat.

Track listings

US and Australian CD single
 "Suga Suga" – 4:03
 "Suga Suga" (instrumental) – 4:03
 "Suga Suga" (a cappella) – 3:26
 "Feelin Me" – 4:09
 "Early in da Morning" – 4:46

European CD single
 "Suga Suga" – 3:59
 "Suga Suga" (remix) – 4:05

European enhanced CD single
 "Suga Suga" – 3:59
 "Suga Suga" (remix) – 4:05
 "Sexy Eyes (Da Da Da Da)" – 4:29
 "Suga Suga" (video)

Credits and personnel
Credits are lifted from Tha Smokin' Nephew booklet.

Studio
 Recorded and mastered at Digital Services (Houston, Texas)

Personnel
 Baby Bash – writing (as Ronald Bryant), vocals
 Frankie J – writing (as Francisco Bautista), featured vocals
 Happy Perez – production, recording, mixing
 James Hoover – mixing
 Gary Moon – mastering

Charts

Weekly charts

Year-end charts

Certifications

Release history

References

2003 singles
2003 songs
Baby Bash songs
Frankie J songs
Songs written by Baby Bash
Songs written by Happy Perez
Universal Records singles